Aadipaapam is a 1979 Indian Malayalam film,  directed by K. P. Kumaran and produced by P. G. Gopalakrishnan. The film stars Shubha and Sukumaran in the lead roles. The film has musical score by Shyam.

Cast
Shubha
Sukumaran

Soundtrack
The music was composed by Shyam and the lyrics were written by Poovachal Khader.

References

External links
 

1979 films
1970s Malayalam-language films